Carmen Louise Vali-Cave (born March 29, 1965) was the first Mayor of Aliso Viejo, California.  During times in her career she has also been known as Carmen Vali and Carmen L. Vali.

City Council
Vali-Cave has been a board member for Aliso Viejo Community Association (AVCA). She was the co-founder and president of Aliso Viejo's Cityhood Committee and on July 1, 2001, Aliso Viejo officially became a city whereupon Vali became a member of City Council.

Upon Aliso Viejo's incorporation, Vali-Cave was elected by City Council to serve as the city's first Mayor.  She served as the City's Mayor Pro Tem in 2005 under Karl Warkomski and in 2006 she was selected a second time to serve as Mayor. Vali-Cave was re-elected to a second four-year term in 2006, served as the City's Mayor Pro Tem for the first half of 2007 and became Mayor for the latter half of 2007 when Mayor Cynthia Adams resigned.

Vali-Cave serves as Aliso Viejo's alternate board member for El Toro Reuse Planning Authority (ETRPA), board member for the Great Park Advisory Council, Chairwoman for the San Joaquin Transportation Corridor Agency (TCA), and alternate Board Member of the Orange County Fire Authority (OCFA).

Vali-Cave has been the Executive Director for the Lincoln-Juarez Opportunity Center since January 2004.  She previously worked as a professional land use planning and development consultant.

References

1965 births
Living people
Mayors of places in California
People from Aliso Viejo, California
Stanford University alumni
Women mayors of places in California
21st-century American women